The Prospekt Haharina or Prospekt Gagarina is a station on Kharkiv Metro's Kholodnohirsko–Zavodska Line. It opened on 23 August 1975. It is located in the southern part of the city's center, at the beginning of the Prospekt Haharina street, for which the station is named, and near the Kharkiv-Levada Railway Station and the nearby autostation, which accounts for the station's fairly large passenger traffic.

During the planning stage of the metro station, the station was to be called Levada. Also, the station was to be decorated in traditional Ukrainian motifs and lettering. On the walls there were supposed to be mosaics depicting grasses and flowers. However, the oblast governing board did not approve of the plans, and some time before the grand opening of the station, the architectural details were taken off, to be replaced with a more standard type of station.

The station is lain shallow underground and is a pillar-trispan, with square columns. The station itself was designed by V.A Spivachyk and P.G. Chechelnitskiy; engineered by P.A. Bochikashvili and V.S. Kotov; and decorated by A.F. Pronin and G.V. Tischenko. For the most part, blank marble was used, although grey granite was also used for the background of the station's name, which is seen in large aluminum letters. The lighting comes from groups of lamps placed in between the "ribs" (bars) of the ceiling. The floor has been paved with polished flags of grey and black granite.

Coming from the side of the station vestibule, the walls are made of light-rose coloured marble, Gazgan. The station has no escalators, since it is put shallow, and instead has wide stairs, above which are installed architectural stained glass windows depicting the triumph of the first man in space, Yuri Gagarin.

External links
 Prospekt Gagarina on Gortransport Kharkiv site

Kharkiv Metro stations
Railway stations opened in 1975